The 1998 Banbridge bombing was the explosion of a car bomb in the town of Banbridge in County Down, Northern Ireland on 1 August 1998. Thirty-three civilians and two Royal Ulster Constabulary (RUC) officers were injured in the attack in a busy shopping street that was later claimed by the Real Irish Republican Army (RIRA), a dissident Irish republican group.

The bomb containing  of explosives was inside a red Vauxhall Cavalier parked on Newry Street. A 20-minute telephone warning was given allowing the police to clear the town centre and potentially avoiding many fatalities, although the warning was "inadequate" and still led to many injuries. The bomb severely damaged the heart of the town and shops in the area, causing an estimated £3.5 million of damage.

After the bombing, local residents, paramedics, and emergency services worked tirelessly to help the injured and clear the debris. Witnesses recounted their experiences to reporters, and there were heart-rending stories of people looking for their loved ones in the aftermath of the explosion. 

At the time it was the most damaging bomb attack since the signing of the Good Friday Agreement in April. Two weeks later, the Real IRA would carry out the infamous Omagh bombing. Shortly afterwards, they had a ceasefire.

The town was targeted previously that year by the Continuity IRA in an attempted car bomb on 6 January 1998, which was safely defused after a warning. Major bombings also occurred there in 1991 and 1982.

See also
Timeline of Real Irish Republican Army actions

References

1998 crimes in the United Kingdom
Explosions in 1998
Provisional Irish Republican Army actions
1998 in Northern Ireland
Car and truck bombings in Northern Ireland
Real Irish Republican Army actions
August 1998 events in the United Kingdom
Terrorist incidents in Northern Ireland
Terrorist incidents in the United Kingdom in 1998
1990s murders in Northern Ireland
1998 crimes in Ireland
Attacks by Republicans since the Good Friday Agreement
bombing
1990s crimes in Northern Ireland